"Out of My Head" is a song by American rapper Lupe Fiasco, released as the third single from his third studio album, Lasers. The single features vocals from American R&B singer Trey Songz, and features production from record producer Miykal Snoddy, with co-production from fellow producers Jerry Wonda and Arden Altino. The song was released as a digital download on May 22, 2011, along with the rest of Lasers. Fiasco performed this single with Trey Songz at the 2011 MTV Movie Awards. Lyrically, the song likens a love interest to that of a catchy song. The song reached number 40 on the Billboard Hot 100, making it his third top 40 hit in the United States. It was named the 34th best song of 2011 by XXL.

Background
Lupe Fiasco says that the song "doesn't have any deep meaning behind it, and is for the chicks."
Trey Songz has praised the song, saying that it was one of his favorite collaborations he ever did.

Music video
A behind-the-scenes video was released on June 19, 2011. The director of the video is Gil Green. The music video was released on June 29, 2011 via MTV. Model Tracey Thomas played the girl throughout the video. Oklahoma City Thunder's Serge Ibaka made a cameo appearance in the video.

Chart performance

Weekly charts

Year-end charts

References

2010 songs
2011 singles
Lupe Fiasco songs
Trey Songz songs
Atlantic Records singles
Songs written by Jerry Duplessis
Songs written by Lupe Fiasco
Music videos directed by Gil Green
Songs written by Arden Altino